Soldiers' Memorial Library is a historic library building at the junction of Park Row and Union Street in Mansfield, Massachusetts.  The -story Gothic Revival structure was designed by the noted firm of Peabody and Stearns, and built in 1899–1901.  The building and land were primarily a gift from Elizabeth F. Noble.  It was designed to house the public library on the ground floor, and provide a memorial to the town's American Civil War soldiers on the upper floor.

The building was listed on the National Register of Historic Places in 1995.  In 2013 the building was housing school administrative offices.

See also
National Register of Historic Places listings in Bristol County, Massachusetts

References

Library buildings completed in 1901
Libraries on the National Register of Historic Places in Massachusetts
Shingle Style architecture in Massachusetts
Buildings and structures in Bristol County, Massachusetts
Mansfield, Massachusetts
National Register of Historic Places in Bristol County, Massachusetts